James Jonathan Agrono Sáenz (born 6 June 1989) is a Colombian football defender who currently plays for Fortaleza F.C.

External links 
 Profile at ZeroZero

References

1989 births
Living people
Association football defenders
Colombian footballers
People from Pasto, Colombia
Sportspeople from Nariño Department